Wxw Tag Team Championship may refer to:

 WXW Tag Team Championship of World Xtreme Wrestling
 WXW Women's Tag Team Championship of World Xtreme Wrestling
 wXw Tag Team Championship of Westside Xtreme Wrestling